The Rwandese carp (Labeobarbus platystomus), is a species of ray-finned fish in the family Cyprinidae. It is found only in Rwanda. Its natural habitat is fast flowing rivers. It is threatened by increased turbidity of the water due to the expansion of agriculture and deforestation in the land the rivers it occurs in drain. Pollution from that agriculture and introduced species also threatened the Rwandese carp.

References

Labeobarbus
Fish described in 1914
Taxonomy articles created by Polbot